Vivek (or Bibek/Bivek in some regions)  (विवेक in Devanagari script) is a masculine given name that is popular in South Asia, particularly in India and Nepal. It is of Sanskrit origin and means "wisdom" and/or "conscience".

Vivek may refer to:
 Vivek (actor) (1961–2021), Indian Tamil film actor
 Vivek Borkar (born 1954), Indian electrical engineer and mathematician
 Vivek Chibber, American sociologist and Marxist theorist
 Vivek Dahiya (born 1984), Indian television actor
 Vivek Gupta (businessman) (born 1960s), Indian-born American businessman
 Vivek Harshan (born 1981), Indian Tamil film editor
 Vivek Kar, Bollywood composer
 Vivek Kundra (born 1974), US Federal CIO
 Vivek Lall (born 1969), Famous aerospace leader
 Vivek (lyricist) (born 1985), Indian Tamil film lyricist
 Vivek Mahbubani (born 1982), Hong Kong stand-up comedian
 Vivek–Mervin, are an Indian musical duo
 Vivek Murthy (born 1977), 19th Surgeon General of the United States
 Vivek Oberoi (born 1976), Bollywood actor
 Vivek Ramaswamy (b. 1985), American entrepreneur, author, and pundit
 Vivek Ranade (born 1963), Indian chemical engineer, entrepreneur and professor
 Vivek Ranadivé (born 1957), American CEO
 Vivek Shraya (born 1981), Canadian musician, writer, and visual artist
 Vivek Singh (disambiguation), several
 Vivek Tiwary (born 1973), American Broadway theater producer and writer/producer of The Fifth Beatle graphic novel
 Vivek Wadhwa, Indian-American technology entrepreneur and an academic

See also
 Dṛg-Dṛśya-Viveka, an Advaita Vedanta text attributed to Bĥaratī Tīrtha or Vidyaranya Swami
 Swami Vivekananda (disambiguation)
 Vivekachudamani, an eighth-century Sanskrit poem in dialogue form that addresses the development of viveka
 Viveka (disambiguation)
 Vivek Nagar
 Vivek Vihar subdivision
 Impatient Vivek, a 2011 Bollywood romantic comedy film
 Vivek Express, a chain of express trains on the Indian Railways network
 Vivek (character of C.I.D.)